This article is a timeline of events relevant to the Islamic Revolution in Iran. For earlier events refer to Pahlavi dynasty and for later ones refer to History of the Islamic Republic of Iran. This article doesn't include the reasons of the events and further information is available in Islamic revolution of Iran.

1941
  August–September: World War II allies Britain and Soviet Union invade Iran to secure railway to supply Soviet Union. They depose Reza Shah whom they consider too sympathetic to the Axis powers, and they exile him to South Africa. His son Mohammad Reza becomes the new Pahlavi Shah of Iran. He was very happy about this

1953
  August: Shah Muhammad Reza Pahlavi, who had resisted for months despite British and American calls for him to dismiss Prime Minister Mohammed Mossaddegh, gets nervous about the popular nationalist prime minister's designs when Mossadegh dissolved the parliament and began rule by decree. As a result, the Shah dismisses Mossadegh as prime minister. But Mossadegh refused to step down and instead arrested the royal messenger delivering the dismissal order. In a panic, the Shah flees to Italy.  CIA and British intelligence initiate and execute "Operation Ajax" with conservative Iranians to overthrow Mossadegh. Shah returns to Iran.

1961
 March 31: Husain Borujerdi, the prominent Marja of all Shi'a, dies. Khomeini  emerges as one of the probable successors to Boroujerdi's position of leadership. This emergence was signaled by the publication of some of his writings on fiqh, most importantly the basic handbook of religious practice entitled, like others of its genre, Tozih al-Masael. He was soon accepted as Marja-e Taqlid (source of imitation) by a large number of Iranian Shi'is. In this year his students, who were the teachers of seminary, established Society of Seminary Teachers of Qom, which played key role during establishment of new government after victory of revolution.

1962
 October–November:  Khomeini organizes opposition to the Shah's Local council election bill. The Bill introduced by Shah's government allows women to vote for the first time and non-Muslims to run for councils. Religious pressure forces government to back down completely and abandon the bill. Khomeini emerges from fight as "the regime's principal political foe" and "undisputed spiritual leader of ... bazaari activists."

1963
 January: Mohammad Reza Pahlavi proposes "White Revolution".  The government introduces a six-point reform bill to be put to a nationwide referendum vote. Six points also included Women's suffrage, as well as other reforms.  Khomeini summoned a meeting of his colleagues in Qom to press upon them the necessity of opposing the Shah's plans.
 January 22: Khomeini issued a strongly worded declaration denouncing the Shah and his plans. Two days later Shah took armored column to Qom, and he delivered a speech harshly attacking the ulama. Khomeini continues his denunciation of the Shah's programs, issuing a manifesto that also bore the signatures of eight other senior scholars. In it he listed the various ways in which the Shah had violated the constitution, condemned the spread of moral corruption in the country, and accused the Shah of comprehensive submission to America and Israel. He also decrees that the Norouz celebrations for the Iranian year 1342 be canceled as a sign of protest against government policies. Escalating antipathy between Shah and Ayatollah climaxes in June with drawing parallels between the Umayyad Caliph Yazid I and the Shah and warns the Shah that if he did not change his ways the day would come when the people would offer up thanks for his departure from the country.
 January 24: Shah orders to arrest Khomeini two days later, and major protest riots in cities over Iran the day after that which is called Movement of 15 Khordad. Martial law is declared and hundreds are killed. After nineteen days in the Qasr prison, Ayatollah Khomeini was moved first to the 'Eshratabad' military base and then to a house in the 'Davoudiyeh' section of Tehran where he is kept under surveillance.

1964
 April 7: Khomeini is released from custody and returns to Qom. In autumn he denounces "capitulations" (the government's underhanded extending of diplomatic immunity to American military personnel), and calls the agreement as surrender of Iranian independence and sovereignty, made in exchange for a $200 million loan that would be of benefit only to the Shah and his associates, and describes all those in the Majlis who voted in favor of it as traitors, concluding that the government is illegitimate. He is arrested immediately and taken to Mehrabad Airport in Tehran. He's exiled in November,   and does not return to Iran for 15 years.

1965
 10am January 22: Hassan-Ali Mansur, the prime minister, who passed the Geneva Convention American Force Protection Act, also known as "Capitulation Law" is assassinated by Mohammad Bokharaii and Amir Abbas Hoveyda is appointed in his stead.
 September 5: Khomeini leaves Turkey for Najaf in Iraq, where he was destined to spend 13 years. He teaches in seminary during this time.

1970
January 21-February 8: Khomeini gives a series of nineteen lectures to a group of his Talaba (students) on Islamic Government while he was in exile in Iraq in the holy city of Najaf. Notes of the lectures were soon made into a book that appeared under three different titles: The Islamic Government, Authority of the Jurist, and A Letter from Imam Musavi Kashef al-Qita (to deceive Iranian censors). The small book (fewer than 150 pages) was smuggled into Iran and "widely distributed" to Khomeini supporters before the revolution.

1975
 March 2: Rastakhiz (Resurrection) party as an Iranian monarchist party is  founded by Mohammad Reza Pahlavi.
 June 1975: Anniversary of the uprising of 15 Khordad. Students at the Feyziyeh madreseh hold a demonstration within the confines of the building, and a sympathetic crowd assembles outside. Both gatherings continues for three days until they are attacked by military forces, resulting in some casualties. Khomeini reacts with a message in which he declares the events in Qom and similar disturbances elsewhere to be a sign of hope that "freedom and liberation from the bonds of imperialism" is at hand.

1977
October 23: Mostafa Khomeini, the son of Ayatollah Khomeini, died while the family lived in Najaf. His death led to unfounded rumors of foul play by Shah's regime and became the subject of a "martyrdom" by opponents of Shah's government, and would fuel the growing discontent with the Shah that eventually led to the Iranian Revolution.

1978

 January 7: An article in the Ettela'at newspaper by the Information Minister Daryoush Homayoun, titled "Black and Red Imperialism" accuses Khomeini of homosexuality and other "misdeeds". Later in his book, Hun claimed that  this was done on the Shah's order.
 January 9: Demonstration of 4,000 students and religious leaders in the city of Qom against the article. The armed police was provoked by the angry demonstrators which resulted in death of between 10 and 72 demonstrators.  Protests credited with breaking the "barrier of fear" of security forces "at the popular level". 
 February 18 : Arbayeen (i.e. 40th day observance) of Qom's fallen protesters. Groups in a number of cities marched to honour the fallen and protest against the rule of the Shah. This time, violence erupted in Tabriz. According to some reports approximately 100 demonstrators are killed.
 March 29: Arbayeen of Tabriz's fallen protesters by demonstrations in various cities. Demonstrators are killed by police in Yazd.
 May 10: Arbayeen of Yazd's fallen protesters.  Demonstrations in various cities. In Qom, commandos "burst into" the home of Ayatollah Kazem Shariatmadari, a leading cleric and quietist, and shoot dead one of his followers right in front of him.  Shariatmadari then joins opposition to the Shah.
 June 6 : Head of SAVAK, Nematollah Nassiri, dismissed and Nasser Moghadam is appointed instead. "First significant concession to the unrest."
June 20: 40th day cycle of marking demonstration deaths passes with little violence, thanks to calls by Shariatmadari's for observance in mosques not on the streets. Inflation subsiding. Regime's "carrot and stick"  and anti-inflation measures seem to be working.
August 6:  Shah pledges free elections by June 1979 in broadcast to the nation.
 August 12: Killing of demonstrators in Isfahan. 
 August 16 : Jamshid Amouzegar declares martial law in response to vast demonstrations.
 August 19: 477 die in arson fire at Cinema Rex in Abadan. Regime and opposition blame each other.
 August 27: Jamshid Amouzegar is replaced by Jafar Sharif-Emami as the prime minister.  Sharif Emami "reverses" some of the Shah's policies. Closes casinos (owned by Pahlavi Foundation), abolishes the imperial calendar and declares all the political parties have the right to be active.
 September 4: Mass march at Eid al-Fitr of hundreds of thousands in Tehran by Khomeini supporters.
 September 8: dubbed "Black Friday" Shah declares martial law in response to protests against Pahlavi dynasty. The military of Iran use force including tanks and helicopters to break up the largely peaceful demonstrators. About 88 demonstrators (including three women) are killed. Opposition leaders falsely spread the death count figures as high as "tens of thousands".
 September 24: Iraqi government embargoes the house of  Khomeini in Najaf and bans his political activities.
 September 25 (3rd of Mehr): Rastakhiz party is disbanded.
 October 3: Khomeini leaves Iraq for Kuwait after being pressured by Iran's neighbor Iraq to "tone down his anti-compromise rhetoric". He is refused entry at the Kuwait border.
 October 6 : Khomeini embarks for Paris.
 October 10: Khomeini takes up residence in the suburb of Neauphle-le-Château in a house that had been rented for him by Iranian exiles in France. He enjoys media attention from journalists across the world who come to France to interview him. His image and words became a daily feature in the world's media.
 October 11: Strike of Newspapers
 October 16: Arbayeen of protesters killed on "Black Friday". Some people were killed in the main mosque of Kerman. "A rapid succession of strikes cripple almost all the bazaars, universities, high schools, oil installations, banks, government ministries, post offices, railways, newspapers, customs and post facilities," etc. and "seal the Shah's fate."
 October 21: Iran Oil industry workers go on strike.
 November 4 : Destructive riots frustrated by Shah's unsuccessful attempts at conciliation with his opponents, military hardliners decide to order troops "to stand aside and allow mobs to burn and destroy to their hearts' content." Thousands of shops, banks, restaurants and other public buildings damaged. Conciliatory Prime Minister Sharif-Emami resigns.  Army raid in Tehran University, students participating in demonstrations are killed.
 November 5 : Shah Mohammad Reza Pahlavi broadcast on television a promise not to repeat past mistakes and to make amends saying, "I heard the voice of your revolution... As Shah of Iran as well as an Iranian citizen, I cannot but approve your revolution."
 November 6: General Gholam Reza Azhari appointed as the prime minister. Enforces martial law.  
 November 8: Shah Mohammad Reza Pahlavi arrests thirteen prominent members of his own regime. 
 November 27: Millions throughout the country celebrate "weeping" and "jumping" after seeing Khomeini's face in the moon, after rumour sweeps the land that the Imam's face will so appear on this night. Even the Tudeh Party embraces the story.
 December 10 and 11: Tasu'a and Ashura. As many as 17 million people "up and down the country march peacefully demanding the removal of the Shah and return of Khomeini." 17-point resolution is presented during the demonstration "declaring the Ayatollah to be the leader of the Iranian people," and calling on Iranians to struggle until the Shah is overthrown.
 December 29: Long-time opposition politician Shapour Bakhtiar was chosen as the prime minister by Shah as the Shah prepares to leave the country. Last prime minister of the Pahlavi dynasty.

1979

 
 January 3: Shapour Bakhtiar of the National Front (Jabhe-yi Melli) was appointed prime minister to replace General Azhari.
 January 4: Shapour Bakhtiar approved as the Prime Minister by Parliament.
 January 12: Revolutionary Council formed by Khomeini to manage revolution. The names of its members are not disclosed.
 January 16: Shah Mohammad Reza Pahlavi and Shahbanu Farah Pahlavi leave Iran for Aswan, Egypt, to be welcome by Anwar Sadat. The Shah states that he has left for vacation and medical treatment.
 January 22: Shah Mohammad Reza Pahlavi and his family leaves Egypt for Morocco.
 January 23: An attempt by the Royal Council to negotiate with Ayatollah Khomeini fails as Jalaleddin Tehrani, the head of the council  who was sent to France, unexpectedly turns against the Royal Council, announces his resignation and declares the council as illegal.
 February 1: Khomeini returns to Iran from exile. According to BBC up to five million people line up in the streets of the Iran's capital, Tehran to witness the homecoming of  Khomeini.
 February 4:  Khomeini appoints Mehdi Bazargan as prime minister of The Interim Government of Iran.
 February 9: Fighting breaks out between pro-Khomeini technicians (Homafaran) of Iran Air Force and Iranian Imperial Guard.
 February 10: Bakhtiar announces martial law with an extended curfew. Khomeini orders followers to ignore it, and proclaims jihad against army units that do not surrender to revolutionaries. Leftist guerrillas and revolutionaries join rebel troops looting arms from police stations and other government facilities. The next morning, the heads of the army finally declare neutrality to avoid disintegration and "further bloodshed".
 February 11 : Regime collapses. Revolution victorious. Pahlavi dynasty ends. Royal prime minister, Bakhtiar, goes into hiding, eventually finding exile in Paris.
 February 12: The committees of Islamic revolution were charged.
 February 18 : Foundation of Islamic Republican party by revolutionary clerics comprising Beheshti, Bahonar, Khamenei, Hashemi Rafsanjani and Mousavi Ardebili.
 March 17: Revolt in Sanandaj.
 March 26 : Revolt in Gonbad-e Qabus. Valyollah Qarani, the first chief of Army after revolution, dismissed by the Interim Government of Iran under pressure of leftist. Naser Farbod is appointed as his replacement.
 March 30 and 31 : National referendum held on whether Iran should become an "Islamic Republic".
March 30: Shah Mohammad Reza Pahlavi and his family  arrives in the Bahamas from Morocco.
 April 1: 98.2% of votes tallied are in favor of an Islamic republic.  Islamic republic established.
 April 17: Revolt in Naqadeh.
 April 20: Valyollah Qarani assassinated by the Forqan group.
 May 1: Morteza Motahhari, one of the most notable ideologists of Islamic revolution, assassinated by the Forqan group.
 May 5: Islamic Revolution Guards Corps established by a decree issued by Ayatollah Khomeini.
 June 5: Early indication of split between Khomeini and non-theocratic intellectuals. In a speech, Khomeini asked: "Who are they that wish to divert our Islamic movement from Islam? ... Intellectuals, do not be Western-style intellectuals, imported intellectuals."
June 10: Shah Mohammad Reza Pahlavi and his family  arrives in Mexico after being denied a visa extension in the Bahamas
June 14: Official preliminary draft of the constitution published. Draft constitution contains Council of Guardians to veto un-Islamic legislation, but no Velayat-e faqih (Guardianship of the Islamic Jurists). Khomeini declares it `correct.`
June 15: Khomeini attacks liberal and leftwing groups as `counter-revolutionaries` against Islam. Groups had advocated the election of a Constituent Assembly to write the new constitution. "No `Westernized jurists` are needed to write the constitution, only `noble members of the clergy.`" "Campaign launched to popularised the idea of the velayat-e faqih," hitherto virtually unknown to most Iranians.
 June 17: "Construction Jihad" was established by the order of the Ayatollah Khomeini.
 August 7: Ayandegan, "the daily newspaper with the widest circulation" in Iran, but "which had agitated against Velayat-e faqih" is banned under new press law for "counter-revolutionary policies and acts."
 August 10:  Khomeini denounces opponents of the Assembly of Experts and defenders of Ayandegan newspaper calling them "wild animals" and saying, "We will not tolerate them any more ... After each revolution several thousand of these corrupt elements are executed in public and burnt ... We will close all parties except the one, or a few which act in a proper manner ..."
 August 12 :  More demonstrations. National Democratic Front schedules a mass demonstration to protest the closure of newspapers like Ayandegan. Demonstration is "viciously attacked by Hezbollah thugs." Shortly thereafter a warrant is issued for the arrest of Hedayat Matin Daftari, one of the National Democratic Front's leaders. Hundreds are injured by rocks, clubs, chains and iron bars. The next day Khomeini supporters attack and loot offices of leftist groups in retaliation for demonstrations.
 August 15:  Revolt in Paveh.
 August 18 :  Assembly of Experts for Constitution which were elected by people, gather to write a new constitution.
 September 9: Mahmoud Taleghani, the high rank revolutionary cleric and member of revolutionary council, dies. A friend of the left, Taleghani is considered the second most popular ayatollah after Khomeini.
 October 14:  Assembly of Experts approves draft of new constitution. In it, Khomeini holds the position of vali-ye faqih, which includes "command of the armed forces" 
 October 22:  Shah Mohammad Reza Pahlavi is allowed to enter United States   for gall bladder treatment. Khomeini speaks out angrily at this "evidence of American plotting." Revolutionary denunciation of the Great Satan (America) intensifies.
 November 1: Prime Minister Bazargan photoed shaking hands with U.S. official Zbigniew Brzezinski at a meeting in Algeria. Radical leftist and theocratic media in Iran alerts the "nation of the return of American influence."
November 4: Aggressive demonstrations take place near the Embassy of the United States. Embassy awaits instructions from Washington D.C. Hostage crisis takes place in the morning: 500 demonstrators climb over the Embassy's fence as the Iranian Police look on. The attack was planned before. Embassy clerks ask for help from the Iranian government which does not come as promised. Embassy guards defend the compound with tear gas because firearms are permitted for use. Secret documents are burned in the Embassy. About ninety people are taken hostage of which 66 are Americans.
November 5: Iranian government cancels all defence treaties with the United States and Soviet Union. 
 November 6:    Mehdi Bazargan, prime minister of The Interim Government of Iran, resigns, "unable to muster" support for "eviction of the students."   Khomeini immediately accepts his resignation along with all the other members of his cabinet.
 November 7: U.S. president Jimmy Carter's appointed  delegation arrives to Iran to negotiate to free the hostages.. Members of the delegation are former federal judge Ramsey Clark and William Miller with the intent to negotiate the end of the hostage crisis. Ayatollah Khomeini refuses to see the delegation.
 November 12 : Iranian Foreign minister Abolhassan Banisadr informs that the hostages will be released if U.S. deports the Shah back to Iran.
 November 14 : U.S. Government freezes the  all property and interests in the property of the government of Iran and the Central Bank of Iran.
 November 17 : Khomeini orders the release of eight African-American and five female hostages 
 November 22 :  Mexico  announces  it  is  unwilling  to  accept  the  return of  Mohammad Reza Pahlavi 
 November 29 : U.S. sues Iran to the Hague International Court for violating international law.
 December 18 : Mohammad Mofatteh assassinated by Forqan group.
 December 2 and 3(11th and 12th of Azar): New Constitution of Iran was approved by referendum by over 98 percent of the vote,  but much lower turnout because of boycott. Khomeini becomes vali-ye faqih.
 December 15 : Shah Mohammad Reza Pahlavi leaves the U.S. for Panama
 December 16 : Shah Mohammad Reza Pahlavi arrives to Panama

1980

 January 25 : The first presidential election of the Islamic Republic. Abolhassan Banisadr elected as President of Islamic republic. His term in office is beset by struggles between him and officials of the Islamic Republic Party.
 January 28 : Six American diplomats escape with Canadian passports from Iran with help from the Canadian Embassy in Tehran.
 March 12:  Iranian  government  demands  that  the  Panamanian  government arrest the  Shah Mohammad Reza Pahlavi  
 March 15: First round of elections of first Islamic parliament. Islamic Republican Party mobilises its network among clergy, komitehs and the revolutionary guard. Hezbollah attacks rallies and offices of opposition parties, primarily the Mojahedin-e Khalq, as most other parties have been effectively repressed.
 March 21: Cultural revolution begins. In New Year's speech, Khomeini inveighs against "imperialist universities" where those "cloaked with the West" teach and study. Declares the universities must "become Islamic."
 March 23:   Shah Mohammad Reza Pahlavi leaves Panama to return to  Egypt.
 March 25 : Shah Mohammad Reza Pahlavi returns to Egypt
 March–May: Mojahedin-e Khalq (MEK), are denounced and its rallies and offices are attacked. 
  April 7: U.S. cuts all diplomatic relationship with Iran and puts Iran under economic embargo.
 April 25 : Operation Eagle Claw;Tehran hostage rescue mission fails with the death of eight U.S. soldiers because of sand storm.  Khomeini credits divine intervention on behalf of Islam. His prestige is greatly enhanced. Banisadr's is further reduced.
 April 27: Demonstration lead by People's Mujahedin of Iran in Tehran draws 150,000. Chief prosecutor bans the Mujahedeen from demonstrating.
 June 12: Formation of the university jihad by decree of Ayatollah Khomeini. and The Cultural Revolution to islamization of universities.
 July: Islamization of state bureaucracy begins. Approximately 20,000 teachers and nearly 8000 military officers are discharged.
 July 11: Nojeh Coup attempt by a portion of the air force personnels is unsuccessful. They are accused of being loyal to Shah and 121 of them are executed
 July 11: One hostage is freed due to health reasons. 52 hostages are still in the Embassy compound.
 July 27: Shah Mohammad Reza Pahlavi dies in Cairo, Egypt after a cancer operation. 
 August: Banisadr forced to accept Mohammad-Ali Rajai as prime minister. Banisadr considers Rajai to be "incompetent", but Rajai has the support of the Islamic Revolution Party.
12 September: Khomeini puts new terms to release the hostages; U.S. has to release all of the Shah's currency assets from his American bank accounts. According to the Iranian government, the worth of the foreign assets are about 32 billion U.S. dollars.
 September 22: Iran–Iraq War starts. Massive invasion of  Iran by Iraq following border skirmishes and a dispute over the Arvand Rūd (Persian: اروندرود, literally Arvand River) or as it is known in Iraq the Shatt al-Arab (Arabic: شط العرب, literally Coast/Beach of the Arabs) waterway. Marks beginning of a war that will last eight years.
 October 26 : Khorramshahr occupied by Iraqis during war.
 November 10 :  U.S. Deputy Secretary of State Warren Christopher’s delegation negotiates alongside the Algerian government with a representative from the Iranian government on terms to free the hostages.

1981

 January 19: Algiers Accords, between Iran and the United States, mediated by Algeria, to resolve an Iran hostage crisis. In exchange for the release of the hostages by Iran, the United States agreed to unfreeze  US$8 billion of Iranian State assets from American banks.
 January 20:  Ronald Reagan is inaugurated as president of the USA: Only 20 minutes from Reagan's oath, Iran releases all 52 hostages who are flown to West Germany via Algeria where former U.S. president Jimmy Carter takes them back to the United States. USA conceded to transfer money, as well as export military equipment to Iran.
 June 8: Abolhassan Banisadr calls for resistance to dictatorship. Khomeini forbids street demonstrations.  
 June 20: Demonstration against Khomeini and theocracy violently suppressed. 
 June 21: Abolhassan Banisadr, first president of Islamic republic, was impeached by the parliament.
 June 21–27: Conflicts between Mujahideen and authorities intensifies.   
 June 22: Abolhassan Banisadr was dismissed by Supreme Leader,  Khomeini.
 June 26: Failed assassination attempt on Ali Khamenei.
 June 28: Explosion of the headquarters of Islamic Republic Party by MEK which resulted in killing of 72 high-ranking officials and representatives including Mohammad Beheshti the secretary-general of the party and head of Judicial system of Iran.
 July 24: Presidential election took place and Mohammad-Ali Rajai chosen as president.
July 29: Abolhassan Banisadr flees from Iran to France by  Iranian Air Force Boeing 707 alongside by Massoud Rajavi
 August 30: President Mohammad-Ali Rajai and his prime minister (Mohammad-Javad Bahonar) are assassinated.
 September 2: parliament voted in favour of Mohammad Reza Mahdavi-Kani as the prime minister of The Interim government of the Islamic Republic, to hold next presidential election and govern country until then.
 September 5: French ambassador to Lebanon Louis Delamare is shot to death in West Beirut by pro-Iranian gunman
 September 21: The Interim government of the Islamic Republic was established after assassination of Mohammad Ali Rajai and Mohammad Javad Bahonar.
 September 27 to September 29: Operation Samen-ol-A'emeh; Breaking the siege of Abadan which was the turning point in Iran–Iraq War.
 October 2: Presidential election took place and Ali Khamenei chosen as president.
 October 13: Ali Khamenei officially became president.
 October 29: Iranian parliament voted in favour of Mir-Hossein Mousavi as the prime minister and the new government replaced Interim Government.

See also 
 Fajr decade
 Anniversary of the Islamic Revolution

References

Further reading

Arjomand, Said Amir. The Turban for the Crown: The Islamic Revolution in Iran, Oxford University Press, (1988).
Harney, Desmond, The Priest and the King: An Eyewitness Account of the Iranian Revolution, Tauris Publishers, 1998.
Mackey, Sandra. The Iranians : Persia, Islam and the Soul of a Nation,  Dutton Adult; 3d ptg. edition, 1996.
Schirazi, Asghar. The Constitution of Iran: Politics and the State in the Islamic Republic, Tauris, 1997.
Taheri, Amir. The Spirit of Allah: Khomeini and the Islamic Revolution, Adler and Adler, 1985.

Iranian Revolution
1978 in Iran
1979 in Iran
1980 in Iran
1981 in Iran
Protests in Iran
Iranian timelines
Politics of Iran